Lost Horizon is a 1973 musical fantasy adventure film directed by Charles Jarrott and starring Peter Finch, Liv Ullmann, Sally Kellerman, George Kennedy, Michael York, Olivia Hussey, Bobby Van, James Shigeta, Charles Boyer and John Gielgud. It was also the final film produced by Ross Hunter. The film is a remake of Frank Capra's 1937 film of the same name, with a screenplay by Larry Kramer. Both stories were adapted from James Hilton's 1933 novel Lost Horizon.

Lost Horizon was lambasted by critics at the time of its 1973 release, and its reputation has not improved since. It was selected for inclusion in the book The Fifty Worst Films of All Time, co-written by critic Michael Medved, and is listed in Golden Raspberry Award founder John Wilson's book The Official Razzie Movie Guide as one of The 100 Most Enjoyably Bad Movies Ever Made. The film was also a box office bomb, losing an estimated $9 million.

Plot
This musical version is much closer to the 1937 film than to the original James Hilton novel. It tells the story of a group of travelers whose DC3 is hijacked while fleeing a bloody revolution. The aeroplane crash lands in an unexplored area of the Himalayas, where the party is rescued and taken to the lamasery of Shangri-La. Miraculously, Shangri-La (based on some aspects of Bhutan's culture), sheltered by mountains on all sides, is a temperate paradise amid the land of snows. Perfect health is the norm, and inhabitants live to very old age while maintaining a youthful appearance.

The newcomers quickly adjust, especially group leader and United Nations Peace Negotiator, Richard Conway. He falls in love with Catherine, a schoolteacher whose parents perished while hiking with her in the mountains. Drug addict photographer Sally Hughes is initially suicidal, but begins counseling with lamas Chang and To Len, eventually finding inner peace. Industrialist Sam Cornelius discovers gold in the local river, but Sally convinces him to use his engineering skills to bring better irrigation to the farmers of Shangri-La instead of smuggling the gold. Harry Lovett is a third-rate comic and song and dance man who has a flair for working with the children of Shangri-La.

Everyone is content to stay except Conway's younger brother, George. Shangri-La, despite its utopian allure, has certain expectations of its citizens. Specifically following the mantra of moderation in all things, simplicity and communal existence, as explained by Chang. George has also fallen in love with Maria, a dancer, and wants to take her along when he leaves. Chang warns Richard that Maria came to Shangri-La over 80 years before, at the age of 20. If she were to leave the valley, she would revert to her actual age.

Richard is summoned to meet the High Lama, who informs him that the plane was hijacked on purpose and that he was brought there for a reason, to succeed him as the leader of the community. The High Lama has been following Richard's actions in the United Nations for years. However, on the night that the High Lama dies, George and Maria insist to Richard that everything the High Lama and Chang have said is a lie. They convince him to leave immediately.

Still in shock from the High Lama's death, Richard leaves without even saying goodbye to Catherine. Not long after their departure, the trio is struggling to keep up with the local guides. As a blizzard starts, an avalanche erupts and kills the party of guides and they are stranded in the storm. Maria suddenly ages and dies, and George, running wildly in grief over the death of his partner, falls to his death down an icy ravine. Richard struggles on alone, ending up in a hospital bed in the Himalayan foothills. The United Nations discovers he has survived and sends a party to take him back to the Western world. However, he runs away, back to the mountains, and finds the portal to Shangri-La once more.

Cast

Musical numbers

Large parts of the score were deleted after the film's roadshow release. The dance sections of "Living Together, Growing Together" were cut, and "If I Could Go Back", "Where Knowledge Ends (Faith Begins)" and "I Come to You" were cut, but restored for the laserdisc release. All of the songs appear on the soundtrack LP and CD. According to the notes on the laserdisc, Kellerman and Kennedy had a reprise of "Living Together, Growing Together" that was also lost.

Hunter wanted to follow up with another musical, set in 1930s Hollywood, titled Hollywood Hollywood. It was never made.

Soundtrack
In his 2013 autobiography, Bacharach cites Lost Horizon as very nearly ending his musical career. He stated that the songs worked when taken in isolation, but not in the context of the film. The Bacharach-David partnership, which had been long and both critically and financially successful, was effectively terminated by their experiences working on the score. Bacharach felt that the producers were sanctioning weakened versions of his music, and he attempted to exert greater influence over what was being developed. However, this led to him being banned from the editing suite at Todd-AO. Bacharach felt that he had been left to defend his position alone, and that Hal David had been inadequately supportive. This led to an exchange of lawsuits, destroying their professional relationship. Bacharach's own versions of several of the songs appeared on his album Living Together (1974).

Of the lead actors, only Kellerman, Van and Shigeta perform their own singing. Kennedy was coached by Bacharach but was not used as a vocalist in the finished film. Hussey, Finch and Ullmann were dubbed by Andra Willis, Jerry Whitman and Diana Lee respectively. Some of the children who provided the singing voices of the Shangri-La children were Alison Freebairn-Smith, Pamelyn Ferdin (a popular child actress of the 1960s and 1970s, who was the original voice of Lucy Van Pelt in the Peanuts TV specials), Harry Blackstone III, David Joyce and Jennifer Hicklin.

The soundtrack was more successful than the film, peaking at No. 56 on the Billboard 200. Commercially successful singles were issued of both the title song, performed by Shawn Phillips, and "Living Together, Growing Together" by The 5th Dimension, the latter being the band's last top 40 hit on the Billboard pop charts. The song "Things I Will Not Miss" was covered by Diana Ross and Marvin Gaye during recording sessions for the 1973 album Diana and Marvin. Tony Bennett recorded "Living Together, Growing Together" and "If I Could Go Back" for MGM/Verve. Richard Harris sang "If I Could Go Back" to the original musical arrangement made for the movie in the 1973 TV special Burt Bacharach in Shangri-La. Herb Alpert recorded an instrumental cover of "I Might Frighten Her Away" on his album "You Smile The Song Begins".

Production
Ross Hunter made his name producing remakes at Universal, including Magnificent Obsession and Imitation of Life. Lost Horizon had been adapted on Broadway as Shangri-La in 1956.

In April 1971, after 20 years of association, Hunter departed Universal and set up operations at Columbia where his first film was to be Lost Horizon. In 1971, Hunter said, 

Hunter called the film "a picture of hope, of faith with a spiritual quality. We all need that with the pressures of the world... Everyone's looking for a place that has peace and security."

Hunter had a role written for Helen Hayes.

Julie Andrews was considered for the role of Catherine.

In December 1971, Charles Jarrott signed to direct, with Peter Finch cast in February 1972. Finch later stated that he enjoyed his time on the film. March 1972 saw the hiring of Hermes Pan as choreographer.

Larry Kramer publicly acknowledged that he is not particularly proud of his workmanlike job adapting the original film's script. However, the deal he engineered for his work on the film—hot on the heels of his Oscar nomination for the screenplay for Women in Love—combined with skilled investments, made it possible for him to live the rest of his creative life free of financial worries. In that sense, this film enabled Kramer to devote himself to the gay community activism and the writings (e.g., his AIDS play The Normal Heart) which came later.

Critical reception
Lost Horizon is considered one of the last of several box-office musical failures of the late 1960s and early 1970s as well as the last musical film to be given the roadshow release, which came in the wake of the success of The Sound of Music. Attempts to update the idea of Shangri-La with its racial inequalities intact, coupled with old-fashioned songs, effectively sealed its fate, according to The New Yorker film critic Pauline Kael. She noted that Shangri-La was depicted as:

a middle-class geriatric utopia [where]...you can live indefinitely, lounging and puttering about for hundreds of years...the Orientals are kept in their places, and no blacks...are among the residents. There's probably no way to rethink this material without throwing it all away.

Julian Fox of Films and Filming raved about the film. "I have to say it, this really is a marvelous film. It's entertaining, the sets really do evoke the spirit of a benevolent Buddha whereas the Capra film gave us an odd mixture of Mandarin and Frank Lloyd Wright...The Himalayan scenes are awe-inspiring-ant-like men plodding in single file across a breathtaking snowscape-the sheer excitement of the uprising in Baskul, the stunning aerial photography and incredible moment the passengers of the crashed aircraft are confronted by the escort party from Shangri-La, moving slowly towards them in the midst of the blizzard is a genuine cinematic feast." 

Arthur Knight of Saturday Review acknowledge that "For a new generation, however, imbued with the ideals of peace and love, this LOST HORIZON may prove very satisfying.  Its main set, the lamasery, is a distinct improvement over the original, which looked like a Pasadena art museum.  Its cast attractive, if not always distinguished. The music is well crafted, if not memorable."

Alan R. Howard of the Hollywood Reporter also liked it. "What's most impressive about Hunter's movie is its technical discipline. Even though the movie is a gigantic production, it has a modest feeling and look.  Director Jarrott explores each scene carefully, there's certainly nothing lazy about his work....The Bacharach score is best in light breezy songs...Robert Surtee's photography is never soupy soft-focus. Instead, it is clean, sharp and efficient, free of the cliches of recent musicals". 

Roger Ebert of the Chicago Sun-Times gave the film one star out of four and wrote that "it sinks altogether during a series of the most incompetent and clumsy dance numbers I've ever seen." Gene Siskel of the Chicago Tribune awarded one star out of four and wrote that "Nothing works. Not the lyrics, not the sets, not the dancing, not the script, and—with all that going against them—not the actors." Vincent Canby of The New York Times called the film "a big, stale marshamallow" that was "surprisingly tacky in appearance" despite its large budget. Charles Champlin of the Los Angeles Times wrote that the film looked "tacky and uncomfortable" and described the songs as "mechanical and uninteresting." Gary Arnold of The Washington Post wrote that the score "leaves almost no impression and certainly nothing resembling a joyful impression", adding "Even if the songs did make you dance with joy, you'd be dancing alone. With the exception of Bobby Van, a kind of poor man's Donald O'Connor, the cast has no aptitude for singing and dancing."

After derided preview screenings Columbia Pictures attempted to re-cut the film, but to no avail. Critic John Simon remarked that it "must have arrived in garbage rather than in film cans." Lost Horizon was such a box-office failure that the film gained the nickname "Lost Investment". Bette Midler alluded to it as "Lost Her-Reason" and famously quipped "I never miss a Liv Ullmann musical". Woody Allen quipped "If I could live my life over again I wouldn't change a thing...except for seeing the musical version of Lost Horizon".

The film was selected for inclusion in the book The Fifty Worst Films of All Time, co-written by critic Michael Medved. The film is listed in Golden Raspberry Award founder John Wilson's book The Official Razzie Movie Guide as one of The 100 Most Enjoyably Bad Movies Ever Made.

Home media
On October 11, 2011, Columbia Classics, the manufacturing-on-demand unit of Sony Pictures Home Entertainment, released a fully restored version of the film on DVD, which reinstated all of the elements cut after the roadshow release. The DVD also contains supplemental features, including promos featuring producer Ross Hunter as well as the original song demos played and sung by composer Burt Bacharach. Some of these demos contain different Hal David lyrics from those in the final versions utilized in the film.

On December 11, 2012, Screen Archives Entertainment (Twilight Time) released an exclusive Blu-ray version of the film, with a 5.1 lossless soundtrack and an isolated film score.

See also

 1973 in film
 List of American films of 1973

References

External links

 
 Film Threat -Truth In Entertainment Modern critical commentary on the film.

1973 films
Columbia Pictures films
Remakes of American films
Films based on British novels
Films shot in Oregon
British adventure films
British musical fantasy films
American musical fantasy films
American adventure films
1970s English-language films
Films set in Asia
Films with screenplays by Larry Kramer
Films directed by Charles Jarrott
Films produced by Ross Hunter
Films scored by Burt Bacharach
1970s musical fantasy films
Lost world films
Films based on adaptations
Musical film remakes
1970s American films
1970s British films